Red gurnard may refer to:
 Chelidonichthys cuculus, the East Atlantic red gurnard
 Chelidonichthys kumu
 Chelidonichthys spinosus, Spiny red gurnard
 Red gurnard perch